Alexander Stewart Bell (born 13 March 1931) is a Scottish former professional footballer, who played as a goalkeeper.

References

1931 births
Living people
Footballers from East Ayrshire
Scottish footballers
Association football goalkeepers
Glenafton Athletic F.C. players
Partick Thistle F.C. players
Exeter City F.C. players
Grimsby Town F.C. players
English Football League players
Scottish Football League players